The  Ministry of Disaster Management and Relief (Duryōga byabasthāpanā ō trāṇa mantraṇālaẏa) is a ministry of the government of the People's Republic of Bangladesh, responsible for disaster management and relief.

Directorate
Cyclone Preparedness Programme (CPP)
Disaster Management Directorate

References

 
Disaster Management and Relief
Emergency management in Bangladesh